27 Hours is a 1986 Spanish quinqui film directed by Montxo Armendáriz which stars Martxelo Rubio, Maribel Verdú and Jon Donosti, also featuring the collaboration of Antonio Banderas.

Plot 
Set in 1980s San Sebastián, the plot tracks three friends (Jon, Patxi and Maite) over the course of 27 hours, two of which are a couple hooked on heroin and the other one works as dockworker.

Cast

Production 
The screenplay was penned by Montxo Armendáriz alongside Elías Querejeta. An Elías Querejeta PC production, the film was shot in San Sebastián, Gipuzkoa. It had the support of ETB. The score was authored by  whereas Javier Aguirresarobe took over the cinematography. The film was shot in Spanish.

Release 
The film screened at the 34th San Sebastián International Film Festival in September 1986.

Accolades 

|-
| align = "center" | 1987 || 1st Goya Awards || colspan = "2" | Best Film ||  || 
|}

See also 
 List of Spanish films of 1986

References 
Citations

Bibliography
 
 

1986 drama films
Films about heroin addiction
Films set in the Basque County
Films shot in Spain
Spanish drama films
1980s Spanish-language films